Molniya (Russian for lightning) may refer to:
 Molniya (satellite), a Soviet military communications satellite
 Molniya orbit
 Molniya (explosive trap), a KGB explosive device
 Molniya (rocket), a variation of the Soyuz launch vehicle
 OKB-4 Molniya, an experimental design bureau responsible for the Molniya R-60 and Vympel R-73 air-to-air missiles
 NPO Molniya, a Soviet design bureau responsible for the Shuttle Buran programme 
 Molnija, a Russian watch and clockmaker
 Molniya, a project of the Tarantul class corvette